This article shows all participating team squads at the 2001 FIVB Women's World Grand Champions Cup, held from November 13 to November 18, 2001 in Japan.

The following is the Brazil roster in the 2001 FIVB Women's World Grand Champions Cup.

The following is the China roster in the 2001 FIVB Women's World Grand Champions Cup.

The following is the Japan roster in the 2001 FIVB Women's World Grand Champions Cup.

The following is the South Korea roster in the 2001 FIVB Women's World Grand Champions Cup.

The following is the Russia roster in the 2001 FIVB Women's World Grand Champions Cup.

The following is the United States roster in the 2001 FIVB Women's World Grand Champions Cup.

References 

G
G